Beginning is a 2023 Indian Tamil-language drama film directed by Jagan Vijaya and starring Vinoth Kishan, Gouri Kishan and Rohini in the lead roles. It was released on 26 January 2023.

Cast

Production
Prior to release, the film was marketed as Asia's first split screen film. Jagan Vijaya made his directorial debut after fifteen years of experience in assisting other filmmakers.

Reception
The film was released on 26 January 2023 across Tamil Nadu. A critic from Times of India gave the film a middling review, noting "more than the content or its form, it's the lead actors who save the film". A reviewer from Cinema Express wrote "impeccable performances, technical brilliance let down by uninspiring writing", adding that "Beginning would have been an extremely inferior film in the hands of amateur leads. But Vinoth and Gauri deliver take care of the heavy lifting". A reviewer form Maalai Malar gave the film 3.25 out of 5 stars, praising the performance of the lead actors.

References

External links

2023 films
2020s Tamil-language films